Madden NFL 2002 (also known as Madden 2002) is an American football video game. It features former Minnesota Vikings quarterback Daunte Culpepper on the cover. Pat Summerall and John Madden are the commentators. The Madden NFL 2002 commercial first aired during Super Bowl XXXVI, three days after Madden NFL 2002 started selling in Japan by Electronic Arts Square. Notably, it does not feature the Super Bowl MVP Tom Brady, who is included on later editions of the game as a roster update. It is also the first game to be developed by Budcat Creations.

Features
Madden NFL 2002 features play now, season, franchise, tournament, create-a-player and create-a-team modes. It also has the Madden Card feature. Along with being a GameCube and Xbox launch title, it was one of the last releases for the Nintendo 64 and Game Boy Color. This is the first Madden game to feature the Houston Texans in the team select (although they did not begin play for another year after the game's debut). It was bundled with NBA Live 2002 and NASCAR Thunder 2002 as part of the EA 2002 collector's edition for the PlayStation. Also the game featured the 2002 Expansion Draft where the player can add the 32nd team into the league, but it will force the Seattle Seahawks to move into the NFC (which will occur in the second season of the 30-season Franchise mode).

The Baltimore Ravens had the best team overall in the game with the score of 99. The worst team in the game belongs to the Houston Texans with the score of 39. The best offense in the game belongs to the St. Louis Rams with the score of 96. The best defense in the game belongs to the Baltimore Ravens with the score of 96. The best special teams in the game belongs to seven different teams (Minnesota Vikings, Tennessee Titans, Baltimore Ravens, Detroit Lions, Indianapolis Colts, San Diego Chargers, and Denver Broncos) all with scores of 99.

Also included as an extra is a slightly modified version of John Madden Football 93 for the Sega Genesis in the PlayStation and Nintendo 64 versions, albeit with an updated roster due to licensing issues.

Reception

The PlayStation 2 and Xbox versions received "universal acclaim", and the Game Boy Advance, GameCube, Nintendo 64 and PlayStation versions received "generally favorable reviews", while the PC version received above-average reviews, according to the review aggregation website Metacritic. NextGen said of the Xbox version in its final issue, "Slightly better than last year's (or even this year's) excellent PS2 version, it's hard to find much fault with this outstanding effort." In Japan, Famitsu gave the PS2 version a score of 33 out of 40.

Kevin "BIFF" Giacobbi of GameZone gave the PC version 9.5 out of 10, saying, "This is probably the most beautiful display of 3-D graphics you will find in any sports game to date. This is of course if your PC has a lot under the hood, especially a good video card." Louis Bedigian gave the Xbox version 9 out of 10, saying, "Control and sound issues aside, this is the best version of Madden 2002 available." He later gave the GameCube version 8.9 out of 10, saying that it was "Harder to control than it should be. I love both the Xbox and GC controllers (a rarity, since most gamers like one, but hate the other), but Madden was not developed for either of them." Kevin Krause gave the PlayStation 2 version the same score of 8.9, calling it "a game that's so feature-rich, so extremely customizable, and so realistic that I'd recommend this one even if you're not a football buff." Michael Lafferty, however, gave the PlayStation version 8 out of 10, saying that it was "Solid graphically and in the audio department." However, William Abner of Computer Games Magazine gave the PC version three stars out of five, saying, "It's better to have not played a game that teases you such as this than to have played it and pulled your hair out in frustration."

The PC version sold 310,000 copies and earned $9.7 million by August 2006 in the U.S., after its release in August 2001. It was the country's 59th best-selling computer game between January 2000 and August 2006. Combined sales of all Madden NFL computer games released between January 2000 and August 2006 had reached 1.9 million units in the U.S. by the latter date.

The game was a runner-up in GameSpots annual award categories for the best Xbox game, best Nintendo 64 game, and best traditional sports console game.

References

External links
 
 
 
 
 

Madden NFL
2001 video games
Electronic Arts games
Nintendo 64 games
Game Boy Color games
GameCube games
Game Boy Advance games
PlayStation (console) games
PlayStation 2 games
Xbox games
Windows games
EA Sports games
Video games developed in the United States
Budcat Creations games
Multiplayer and single-player video games